Brown's Crossing or Browns Crossing may refer to:

Brown's Crossing (Manx Electric Railway), a railroad stop on the Isle of Man
Browns Crossing, Georgia, an unincorporated community